El Sabinal is a colony of Plautdietsch-speaking Mennonites in the Mexican state of Chihuahua founded in the 1990s. It is the most traditional colony of the so-called "Russian" Mennonites in northern Mexico, indicated by the horse and buggy transportation that is still in use there. The community speaks Low German.

References

Populated places in Chihuahua (state)
Russian Mennonite diaspora in Mexico